In mathematics, Moore determinant, named after Eliakim Hastings Moore,  may refer to 
 The determinant of a Moore matrix over a finite field
The Moore determinant of a Hermitian matrix over a quaternion algebra